Kursanbek Sheratov (ru: Курсанбек Шератов), born 10 March 1989, was a Kyrgyzstani footballer who was banned for life from playing football in August 2019.

Career

Club
On 22 July 2019, FC Dordoi Bishkek announced that Sheratov had left their club. On 2 August 2019, the Asian Football Confederation announced that Sheratov had been banned for life for his involvement in a conspiracy to manipulate matches during Dordoi Bishkek 2017 AFC Cup campaign.

International
Sheratov was a member of the Kyrgyzstan national football team from 2009.

Career Stats

International

Statistics accurate as of match played 10 October 2018

References

External links
ffkr.kg
uff.uz

1984 births
Kyrgyzstani footballers
Living people
Footballers at the 2010 Asian Games

Association football defenders
Asian Games competitors for Kyrgyzstan
Kyrgyzstan international footballers